William McAdam may refer to:
 William McAdam (British politician), member of parliament for Salford North
 William McAdam (Australian politician), member of the Victorian Legislative Assembly
 William McAdam (cricketer), South African cricketer
 William McAdam (merchant), Scottish-American merchant and businessman